Cellular may refer to:

Cellular automaton, a model in discrete mathematics
Cell biology, the evaluation of cells work and more
Cellular (film), a 2004 movie
Cellular frequencies, assigned to networks operating in cellular RF bands
Cellular manufacturing
Cellular network, cellular radio networks
U.S. Cellular Field, also known as "The Cell", a baseball stadium in Chicago
U.S. Cellular Arena, an arena in Milwaukee, Wisconsin

Terms such as cellular organization, cellular structure, cellular system, and so on may refer to:

Cell biology, the evaluation of how cells work and more
Cellular communication networks, systems for allowing communication through mobile phones and other mobile devices
Cellular organizational structures, methods of human organization in social groups
Clandestine cell organizations, entities organized to commit crimes, acts of terror, or other malicious activities

See also
Cell (disambiguation)